South Lyon East High School is a public high school in Lyon Township, Michigan in Metro Detroit, near South Lyon. It is a part of South Lyon Community Schools and the Oakland Schools intermediate school district. It is accredited by North Central Association of Colleges and Schools.

The school was built to compensate for the overcrowding at South Lyon High School. It opened in September 2007. Since then, the school has attained a population of a little over a thousand students. These students participate in a variety of clubs and curriculares, including band, choir, theater, NHS, and others, on top of East’s sports teams.

Extracurricular activities

Athletics
South Lyon East is a member of the Lakes Valley Conference. Their nickname is the Cougars and the school colors are black and silver. Numerous fall, winter, and spring sports are offered at South Lyon East such as football, basketball, ski, and cheer. A full list is below.

Fall
 Men's Football
 Women's Basketball
 Men's Cross Country
 Women's Cross Country
 Women's Golf
 Women's Swimming and Diving
 Men's Soccer
 Women's Cheer
 Women's Pompon
 Men's Tennis
 Coed Equestrian
Women's Volleyball
 Marching Band

Winter
 Men's Basketball
 Wrestling
 Men's Swimming and Diving (Combined w/ South Lyon High School)
 Women's Competitive Cheer
 Women's Competitive Pompon
 Men's Hockey (Combined w/ South Lyon High School)
 Men's Bowling
 Women's Bowling
 Ski (Unified w/ South Lyon High School)

Spring
 Men's Baseball
 Women's Softball
 Men's Track and Field
 Women's Track and Field
 Women's Soccer
 Men's Golf
 Women's Tennis
 Women's Lacrosse
 Men's Lacrosse

References

External links
School website

Public high schools in Michigan
High schools in Oakland County, Michigan
Educational institutions established in 2007
2007 establishments in Michigan